Amber Shirell Holt (born June 7, 1985) is an American professional women's basketball player most recently with the Tulsa Shock in the Women's National Basketball Association (WNBA).

Early life 
Holt was born in Norcross, Georgia. She is the daughter of Cassandra Holt. Holt is joined by her two brothers, Cortez and DeMarkus Dennis.

High school career
Holt attended Meadowcreek High School in Norcross, Georgia. Holt averaged 19.1 points, 7.0 rebounds and 4.5 assists as a senior while leading the Lady Mustangs to a 20–7 record. Holt was a first-team All-State performer as a junior when she led Meadowcreek to a 24–6 record and a runner-up finish in the 2002 Class AAAAA State Tournament.

College career
Holt went to Southeastern Illinois College. As a freshman, Holt was named second-team All-America by the NJCAA after averaging 20.3 points, 10.9 rebounds and 3.6 steals for SIC ... Among national leaders, she finished the season ranked No. 9 in both scoring and rebounding, as well as No. 10 in steals, No. 46 in free throw percentage (.775) and No. 50 in field goal percentage (.539) ... As a sophomore, Holt was a Kodak All-American and a first-team All-America pick by the NJCAA ... Averaged 20.2 points, 9.5 rebounds, 4.9 assists and 4.0 steals while leading Southern Illinois to a 33–3 record and a fifth-place finish at the NJCAA Tournament. Nationally, she ranked No. 15 in scoring, No. 30 in rebounding, No. 12 in steals, and No. 40 in assists.

Holt transferred to Middle Tennessee State University. As a senior during the 2007–2008 season, she was the top scoring player in Division I.

Middle Tennessee statistics

Source

WNBA career 
In the 2008 WNBA Draft, Holt was picked by the Connecticut Sun in the first round, 9th overall.

WUBA Career 
In 2020 Holt played with the Southern Lady Generals winning the Eurobasket.com player of the year award
leading them to the WUBA Championship.

Overseas career
She played with Sopron in Hungary during the 2008–09 WNBA off-season.

See also
List of NCAA Division I women's basketball season scoring leaders

References

External links 
Amber Holt Playerfile
Middle Tennessee Blue Raiders bio

1985 births
Living people
All-American college women's basketball players
American expatriate basketball people in Hungary
American women's basketball players
Basketball players from Georgia (U.S. state)
Connecticut Sun draft picks
Connecticut Sun players
Middle Tennessee Blue Raiders women's basketball players
People from Norcross, Georgia
Small forwards
Southeastern Illinois Falcons women's basketball players
Sportspeople from the Atlanta metropolitan area
Tulsa Shock players